The Tanners' Bridge is an 18th-century Ottoman period stone footbridge located in Tirana, Albania. The bridge, built near the Tanners' Mosque, was once part of the Saint George Road that linked Tirana with the eastern highlands. The road was the rout by which livestock and produce entered the city. The bridge crossed the Lanë stream near the area where butcher shops and leather workers were located. The bridge fell into disrepair when the Lanë was diverted in the 1930s. In the 1990s the bridge was restored for use by pedestrians.

History

The Tanners' Bridge was part of the road that connected Tirana with Debar through Shëngjergj, also called Shëngjergj Road.  The road to Debar passed through Priskë e Madhe, Qafe Priskë, Domje, Shëngjergj, and further it continued through Bizë, Martanesh, Zerqan and finally Debar. The road connected Tirana with the eastern highlands, and was mainly used by farmers to bring produce and livestock into the city. The butchering profession was owned by certain families such as Xheleti, or Kuka families. They were called tabakë in Albanian which is the profession that includes both butchering and tanning. The road within the city, a square and also the bridge itself were called Rruga e Tabakëve.

The bridge was in use across the Lanë stream to the other until the 1930s. Later the Lanë was diverted from its previous course.

In the 1990s the bridge was cleaned and fully restored, and now the bridge is used for pedestrians only. In 2007 one of the engineers that worked on the "Ethnography in movement" project declared to the Albanian News Agency that the underground infrastructural work on the bridge had been completed. During the restoring work the bridge's foundations were uncovered and an artificial pond was recreated on both sides of the bridge. In addition, the original stones of the bridge were cleaned up. A historical reevaluation of the area is in the municipality projects, inclusive of the construction of an underground market. The overall project intends that the entire area be used by pedestrians only. The intended area extends from the Tanners' bridge to the square where the flag of Albania was raised for the first time on 26 November 1912.

The bridge is now seen by the municipality of Tirana as one of the most important cultural heritage monuments of the city. The bridge is considered as a testimony of Tirana's urban development in the 18th century. The Tanner's Bridge is also a testimony of fine bridge construction from the area of Tirana.

References

External links
 Pictures of Tanners' Bridge

Bridges completed in the 18th century
Buildings and structures in Tirana
Tourist attractions in Tirana
Stone arch bridges
Pedestrian bridges in Albania
Ottoman bridges in Albania